Second Coming is the second album by Swedish hard rock group Shotgun Messiah, released in 1991 on Relativity Records.

Track listing
All songs written by Tim Skold and Harry Cody, except where noted.
"Sex Drugs Rock 'n' Roll" - 3:25
"Red Hot" - 4:23
"Nobody's Home" - 4:44
"Living Without You" - 4:07
"Heartbreak Blvd" - 4:18
"I Want More" (Cody) - 6:10
"Trouble" - 4:36
"Ride the Storm" - 3:59
"I Wanna Know" (Skold) - 4:46
"Babylon" (David Johansen, Johnny Thunders) - 2:57
"Free" (Cody) - 5:13
"You & Me" (Cody) - 4:15
"Can't Fool Me" (Skold) - 4:00

Personnel
Tim Skold - Vocals
Harry Cody - Guitars
Bobby Lycon - Bass
Stixx Galore - Drums

Notes: Stixx Galore is credited as drummer - although he was still a member of the band, the drums on Second Coming is a mix between programmed and triggered drums.

Additional musicians:
PAT REGAN - "Silly percussion" on "I Wanna Know"

Produced by Harry Cody and Tim Skold. Recorded at Fortress Studios.

References

To ad some "realism" to the programmed drums, Stixx played the symbols in the studio recording sessions.

1991 albums
Shotgun Messiah albums